İmam bayıldı (literally: "the imam fainted") is a dish in Ottoman cuisine consisting of whole aubergine stuffed with onion, garlic and tomatoes, and simmered in olive oil. The dish is served at room temperature or warm.

Origin of the name
The name supposedly derives from a tale of a Turkish imam who swooned with pleasure at the flavour when presented with this dish by his wife, although other more humorous accounts suggest that he fainted upon hearing the cost of the ingredients or the amount of oil used to cook the dish. Another account is that he ate so much of it that he passed out.

Another folk-tale relates that an imam married the daughter of an olive oil merchant. Her dowry consisted of twelve jars of the finest olive oil, with which she prepared each evening an aubergine dish with tomatoes and onions. On the thirteenth day, there was no aubergine dish at the table. When informed that there was no more olive oil, the imam fainted.

Geographic distribution

Imam bayildi is also well-known under minor variants of the Turkish name in Bulgaria, Israel, North Macedonia, Greece, Albania, Armenia, and the Arab world, and in English as "Imam bayeldi". During Ottoman times, the dish also spread to Anatolia's Pontian minority; in their language, it's called .

Variants 
An imam bayıldı made with ground meat becomes a karnıyarık.

See also 
 Caponata
 List of eggplant dishes

References

Eggplant dishes
Stuffed vegetable dishes
Ottoman cuisine
Vegan cuisine
Turkish cuisine
Albanian cuisine
Pontic Greek cuisine